"Only Teardrops" is a song recorded by Danish singer Emmelie de Forest. The song was written by Lise Cabble, Julia Fabrin Jakobsen and Thomas Stengaard, and it was produced by Frederik Thaae. It is best known as Denmark's winning entry to the Eurovision Song Contest 2013 held in Malmö, Sweden. The song competed in the first semi-final on 14 May 2013 and managed to qualify for a spot in the final on 18 May 2013. The song competed in the final against 25 other songs, and finished in first place with 281 points.

Chart performance
The song was an instant hit in de Forest's home country of Denmark, where it debuted and peaked at number two on the Danish Singles Chart upon its release. Following its victory in the Eurovision Song Contest, the song re-entered the singles chart at number one. It has since been certified gold by IFPI Denmark for sales of 15,000 digital copies. It was the fourteenth best-selling digital single in Denmark in 2013.

In the United Kingdom, "Only Teardrops" debuted at number 99, despite Eurovision airing only four hours before the cut-off point for the chart. A week later, the single rose to a high of #15 in the UK. In its third week, it dropped to No. 84 and dropped out of the chart the following week after 3 weeks on British chart. According to The Official Charts Company, "Only Teardrops" is the seventh most downloaded Eurovision song to date in the United Kingdom.

Track listing
Digital download
"Only Teardrops" – 3:03

CD single
"Only Teardrops" – 3:03
"Only Teardrops" (instrumental version) – 3:03

Digital download – Kongsted remix
"Only Teardrops" (Kongsted remix) – 5:34
"Only Teardrops" (Kongsted remix radio edit) – 3:40

Credits and personnel
Lise Cabble – songwriter
Julia Fabrin Jakobsen – first songwriter
Thomas Stengaard – songwriter
Frederik Thaae – producer, keyboards, guitar, drums, programming
Emmelie de Forest – vocals
Gunhild Overegseth – backing vocals
Hans Find Møller – Tin whistle
Tore Nissen – vocal production

Credits adapted from Danmarks Radio.

Music video
Emmelie posted several photographs onto her Facebook account from the shooting of the video. The video is directed by Michael Sauer Christensen. It has been filmed in the forest and on the beach. It was released on 13 June 2013, in DR's official website.

Charts and certifications

Weekly charts

Year-end charts

Certifications

Release history

References

2013 debut singles
Eurovision songs of 2013
Eurovision songs of Denmark
English-language Danish songs
Songs written by Lise Cabble
Eurovision Song Contest winning songs
2013 songs
Number-one singles in Denmark
Number-one singles in Greece
Number-one singles in Iceland
Sony Music singles